Peter Iliev (born June 11, 1984) is a Bulgarian luger who has competed since 2000. Competing in two Winter Olympics, he earned his best finish of 31st in the men's singles event at Turin in 2006.

Iliev also finished 41st in the men's singles event at the 2007 FIL World Luge Championships in Igls.

References
 2006 luge men's singles results
 FIL-Luge profile

External links
 

1984 births
Bulgarian male lugers
Living people
Lugers at the 2006 Winter Olympics
Lugers at the 2010 Winter Olympics
Olympic lugers of Bulgaria